Thirty-Minute Theatre was a British anthology drama series of short plays shown on BBC Television between 1965 and 1973, which was used in part at least as a training ground for new writers, on account of its short running length, and which therefore attracted many writers who later became well known. It was produced initially by Harry Moore, later by Graeme MacDonald, George Spenton-Foster, Innes Lloyd and others.

Thirty-Minute Theatre began on BBC2 in 1965 with an adaptation of the black comedy Parson's Pleasure (author, Roald Dahl). Dennis Potter contributed Emergency – Ward 9 (1966), which he partially recycled in the much later The Singing Detective (1986). In 1967 BBC2 launched the UK's first colour service, with the consequence that Thirty-Minute Theatre became the first drama series in the country to be shown in colour.

As well as single plays, the series showed several linked collections of plays, including a group of four plays by John Mortimer named after areas of London in 1972, two three-part Inspector Waugh series starring Clive Swift in the title role, and a trilogy of plays by Jean Benedetti, broadcast in 1969, focusing on infamous historical figures such as Adolf Hitler and Joseph Stalin. Other plays were broadcast by writers like Charlotte and Denis Plimmer (The Chequers Manoeuvre, 1968), David Rudkin (Bypass, 1972, and Atrocity, 1973) and Jack Rosenthal (And for My Next Trick, 1972).

Thirty-Minute Theatre was cancelled in August 1973. Second City Firsts, also of 30 minutes duration, fulfilled much the same role.

Archive holdings

Of the original 291 episodes, 241 are missing, one is incomplete and 3 exist on formats inferior to the original.

Productions
Sourced according to the BBC Genome archive of Radio Times magazines, with additional information from the BFI database and TV Brain. All episodes were broadcast on BBC2. Identification of distinct seasons beyond the fifth is tentative.

See also
Other BBC2 drama anthology series include
 Theatre 625
 Second City Firsts
 BBC2 Playhouse
 Screen Two

References

External links
 

1965 British television series debuts
1973 British television series endings
1960s British drama television series
1970s British drama television series
BBC television dramas
1960s British anthology television series
1970s British anthology television series
Lost television shows
English-language television shows